Gorokhovets is a town and the administrative center of Gorokhovetsky District in Vladimir Oblast, Russia, located on the highway from Moscow to Nizhny Novgorod. It also serves as a river port on the Klyazma River. Population:

Etymology
The name of the town originates from the Russian word "" (gorokh, "peas").

History
Gorokhovets was first mentioned in a 1239 chronicle, when it was sacked by the Mongols. It is believed that a minor fortress had existed there for several preceding decades.

In 1539, the Tatars of Kazan were about to burn it but retreated upon allegedly seeing a ghost in a shape of a gigantic knight with a sword. After that, the mount where the apparition was seen came to be known as Puzhalovo ("frightening one").

The golden age of Gorokhovets is associated with the 17th century, when it was a merchandise center for a large area, which comprised today's Vladimir and Ivanovo Oblasts. A number of churches, monasteries, and chambers were commissioned by the local merchants at that time. The 17th-century belfries of Gorokhovets are particularly noteworthy.

Administrative and municipal status
Within the framework of administrative divisions, Gorokhovets serves as the administrative center of Gorokhovetsky District, to which it is directly subordinated. As a municipal division, the town of Gorokhovets is incorporated within Gorokhovetsky Municipal District as Gorokhovets Urban Settlement.

Coat of arms
Gorokhovets' coat of arms combines Vladimir's heraldic lion with peas, alluding to the plant which gave rise to the town's name.

Trivia
According to the Soviet TV series Seventeen Moments of Spring, Gorokhovets was a native town of Stierlitz, a fictional Soviet spy in Nazi Germany, played by Vyacheslav Tikhonov.

References

Notes

Sources

External links
Official website of Gorokhovets 
Gorokhovets Business Directory  
History of Gorokhovets

Cities and towns in Vladimir Oblast
Gorokhovetsky Uyezd
Golden Ring of Russia